Zelentsovo is a rural locality (a village) and the administrative center of Zelentsovskoye Rural Settlement, Nikolsky District, Vologda Oblast, Russia. The population was 353 as of 2002.

Geography 
Zelentsovo is located 55 km northwest of Nikolsk (the district's administrative centre) by road. Sluda is the nearest rural locality.

References 

Rural localities in Nikolsky District, Vologda Oblast